The 2020–21 UTSA Roadrunners men's basketball team represented the University of Texas at San Antonio during the 2020–21 NCAA Division I men's basketball season. The team was led by fifth-year head coach Steve Henson, and played their home games at the Convocation Center in San Antonio, Texas as members of Conference USA.

Roster

Schedule and results

|-
!colspan=12 style=|Non-conference regular season

|-
!colspan=12 style=|CUSA regular season

|-
!colspan=9 style=| Conference USA tournament

|-

See also
 2020–21 UTSA Roadrunners women's basketball team

Notes

References

UTSA Roadrunners men's basketball seasons
UTSA Roadrunners
UTSA Roadrunners men's basketball
UTSA Roadrunners men's basketball